The Coraciiformes  are a group of usually colourful birds including the kingfishers, the bee-eaters, the rollers, the motmots, and the todies. They generally have syndactyly, with three forward-pointing toes (and toes 3 & 4 fused at their base), though in many kingfishers one of these is missing. The members of this order are linked by their “slamming” behaviour, thrashing their prey onto surfaces to disarm or incapacitate them. 

This is largely an Old World order, with the representation in the New World limited to the dozen or so species of todies and motmots, and a mere handful of the more than a hundred species of kingfishers.

The name Coraciiformes means "raven-like". Specifically, it comes from the Latin language "corax", meaning "raven" and Latin "forma", meaning "form", which is the standard ending for bird orders.

Systematics

This order has been seen to be something of a mixed assortment, and the Coraciiformes may be considered as including only the rollers. All the other families would then be considered to represent lineages of birds distantly related to Coraciiformes. This seems to be oversplitting, as most Coraciiformes indeed form a reasonably robust clade.

Analysis of nDNA c-myc and RAG-1 exon as well as mtDNA myoglobin intron 2 sequence data demonstrates that the Coraciiformes can be divided into a basal group that is not too distantly related to the Piciformes, and a derived suborder containing mainly kingfishers (Johansson & Ericson, 2003). The cuckoo roller's true affinities appear to lie elsewhere. The trogons and hornbills are either very basal lineages, or might be considered distinct own orders; the latter are apparently slightly closer to the rollers than the former. The entire group (possibly excluding the cuckoo roller) and the Piciformes are closely related to the Passeriformes (Johansson & Ericson 2003; see also near passerine).

Several extinct coraciiform families are only known from Paleogene fossils. They probably belong to the basal group and are sometimes difficult to assign because they were even closer still to the Piciformes (see also Neanis). In addition, there are some prehistoric genera which are likewise difficult to place into a family. At least the Eocoraciidae are very basal, but the Late Eocene (some 35 mya) Geranopteridae form a superfamily Coracioidea with the extant rollers and ground-rollers already (Mayr & Mourer-Chauviré 2000). A few prehistoric taxa of the present-day families have been described; see the family articles for details.

Taxonomic sequence
Unresolved
 Genus Quasisyndactylus (fossil; Middle Eocene of Messel, Germany) - alcediniform, basal?
 Genus Cryptornis (fossil; Late Eocene of France) – bucerotid? geranopterid?
 Family Primobucconidae (fossil), including Primobucco and Septencoracias
 Coraciiformes gen. et spp. indet. PQ 1216, QU 15640 (fossil; Late Eocene of Quercy, France: Mayr & Mourer-Chauviré 2000)
 Genus Protornis (fossil: Oligocene of Switzerland) – basal to motmotids and meropids?

A recent study suggest that the following families may belong to a separate order called Bucerotiformes. The results still in dispute though.
 Family Bucorvidae (ground hornbills)
 Family Bucerotidae (hornbills)
 Family Upupidae (hoopoe)
 Family Phoeniculidae (woodhoopoes)

The Leptosomidae (cuckoo roller) probably do not belong here. The trogons are sometimes placed here as a family Trogonidae. The Late Eocene Palaeospizidae are sometimes also placed in the Coraciiformes, as are the Early to Middle Eocene Primobucconidae and the Middle Eocene to Early Oligocene Sylphornithidae. The Primobucconidae at least indeed seem to belong here.

Basal group
 Family Eocoraciidae (fossil; Middle Eocene of Messel, Germany)
 Family Geranopteridae (fossil; Late Eocene of Quercy, France – Early Miocene of Czech Republic) - includes "Nupharanassa" bohemica
 Family Coraciidae (rollers)
 Family Brachypteraciidae (ground-rollers)
 Family Meropidae (bee-eaters)

Suborder Alcedines
 Family Todidae (todies)
 Family Momotidae (motmots)
 Family Alcedinidae (kingfishers)

See also
 List of Coraciiformes by population

References

Johansson, Ulf S. & Ericson, Per G. P. (2003): Molecular support for a sister group relationship between Pici and Galbulae (Piciformes sensu Wetmore 1960). J. Avian Biol. 34(2): 185–197.  PDF fulltext
Mayr, Gerald & Mourer-Chauviré, Cécile (2000): Rollers (Aves: Coraciiformes. s.s.) from the Middle Eocene of Messel (Germany) and the Upper Eocene of the Quercy (France). J. Vertebr. Paleontol. 20(3): 533–546. DOI:10.1671/0272-4634(2000)020[0533:RACSSF]2.0.CO;2 PDF fulltext
Terres, John K. (1980) The Audubon Society Encyclopedia of North American Birds.

External links
 Order Coraciiformes - Biodiversity Overview: Untamed Science
 Tree of Life: Coraciiformes

 
Extant Eocene first appearances
Bird orders
Eocene taxonomic orders
Oligocene taxonomic orders
Miocene taxonomic orders
Pliocene taxonomic orders
Pleistocene taxonomic orders
Holocene taxonomic orders